Kofan may refer to:

 Kofan, Mali, a rural commune in Mali
 Kofan people, or Cofan, an ethnic group of Ecuador and Colombia
 Kofan language, or Cofan, a language of Ecuador and Colombia

Language and nationality disambiguation pages